Nikolay Victorovich Prokof'ev is a Russian-American physicist known for his works on supersolidity and strongly correlated systems and pioneering numerical approaches.

Biography 
He received his MSc in physics in 1982 from Moscow Engineering Physics Institute, Moscow, Russia. In 1987, he received his PhD in theoretical physics from Kurchatov Institute (Moscow), under the supervision of Yuri Kagan, where he worked from 1984 to 1999. In 1999, he became a professor at the Physics Department of the University of Massachusetts Amherst.

Research 
He is recognised for his  research on strongly correlated states in electronic and bosonic systems, critical phenomena, and quantum Monte Carlo methods.

His and his coauthors have made key contributions to the theory of supersolids  includes the theory of superfluidity of crystalline defects, such as the appearance of superfluidity on grain boundaries and in dislocation cores  (reviewed in ) and superglass state. He  co-invented, with Boris Svistunov and Igor Tupitsyn  of the widely used Worm Monte-Carlo algorithm. With Boris Svistunov he invented the Diagrammatic Monte-Carlo method  which is stochastic summation of Feynman diagrammatic series which is free from the Numerical sign problem.

He is an elected Fellow of the American Physical Society,  for "pioneering contributions to theories of dissipative quantum dynamics and for innovative Monte Carlo approaches to quantum and classical studies of critical phenomena."

He coauthored the book on modern theory of superfluidity.

References 

20th-century American physicists
Russian physicists
Scientists from Moscow
Fellows of the American Physical Society
University of Massachusetts Amherst faculty
Russian emigrants to the United States
Living people
Year of birth missing (living people)